was a village located in Miyako District, Okinawa, Japan. It was home to the Ueno German Culture Village.

As of 2003, the village has an estimated population of 3,236 and a density of 170.5 persons per km². The total area was 18.98 km².

On October 1, 2005, Ueno, along with the city of Hirara, and the towns of Gusukube, Irabu and Shimoji (all from Miyako District), was merged to create the city of Miyakojima.

Dissolved municipalities of Okinawa Prefecture